Riding Mountain Airport  is a small private airport located near the community of Riding Mountain, Manitoba, Canada.

References

Registered aerodromes in Manitoba